The Four-man bobsleigh competition at the 1992 Winter Olympics in Albertville was held on 21 and 22 February, at La Plagne.

Results

References

External links
Wallechinsky, David and Jaime Loucky (1992). "Bobsleigh: Two-Man". In The Complete Book of the Winter Olympics: 2010 Edition. London: Aurum Press Limited. pp. 159–60.

Bobsleigh at the 1992 Winter Olympics